Katherine Shannon Collins is a Canadian-born cartoonist, writer, media personality, stage performer, and composer. She created the newspaper comic strip Neil the Horse from 1975 to 1991.

Biography 
Katherine Collins (formerly Arnold Alexander Saba, Jr.) was born in Vancouver, British Columbia on July 6, 1947. Her name comes from her maternal great-grandmother, Mary Adda "Dolly" Collins, a painter, writer, and illustrator herself. Collins’s mother was also a cartoonist and comics collector and instilled in her from a young age an interest in the world of comics. Her earliest influences include Carl Barks and Milton Caniff whose comics she collected throughout the 1950s and onward. She started reading underground comics in the late 60s, enjoying artists such as Robert Crumb, Kim Deitch, Skip Williamson, Jay Lynch, and Trina Robbins. Growing up in Canada, she was surrounded by and presented with works of both American and British comics culture.

Career

Early works 
In 1965, Katherine (then known as Arn Saba) attended the University of British Columbia on a creative writing scholarship but devoted almost all her time at UBC to the campus twice-weekly paper, The Ubyssey, where she created her first comic strip, Moralman (1965–1968). She also wrote and illustrated several articles.

In 1977, she moved to Toronto to try for success in a larger arena. She immediately began appearing on, and eventually producing, segments of the popular national CBC Radio program Morningside. She was usually paired with host Don Harron for free-wheeling discussions of favorite old comic strips and other pop culture. She also wrote, produced, and acted in scores of comedy skits. Collins made similar appearances on CBC Television, on the Don McLean show.

In 1979, she wrote and produced a five-part radio documentary on CBC, The Continuous Art, exploring the cultural position of comics. It featured interviews with some of cartooning's greatest names, including Milton Caniff, Hal Foster (his last interview), Floyd Gottfredson, Hugo Pratt, Will Eisner, Jules Feiffer, and Russ Manning. Collins spent several years in the late 1970s and early 1980s travelling throughout North America, interviewing famous cartoonists. Many of these interviews were later published in The Comics Journal in the 1980s and 1990s.

In 1982, Collins moved to California, ceasing all other media activity in favor of cartooning, except for a brief run as Art Director of the Transsexual News Telegraph magazine for their 1999-2000 issue.

Neil the Horse 

Collins's most notable creation is Neil the Horse. The series ran in Canadian newspapers from 1975-1982 via the Great Lakes Publishing syndicate located in Toronto. It subsequently appeared in fifteen comic book issues from 1983–1988, published by Aardvark-Vanaheim/Renegade Press.

The drawing style is based on Disney comics, as well as early twentieth-century Sunday pages. The motto for the series was "Making the World Safe for Musical Comedy," and many issues of the comic book feature the characters singing and dancing. When the characters are shown dancing, it is to original choreography.

Collins took a vaudevillian approach to the work, emulating early twentieth-century hardbound children's annuals, changing the storytelling approach repeatedly within each issue. The work morphed from comic strip, comic book, and illustrated prose, and contained sheet music, crossword puzzles, joke pages, and more. In the letters columns, the characters "answered" the mail. The book also featured paper dolls and fashion pages, in the tradition of Katy Keene.

Collins's efforts to continue the project in print were unsuccessful. It was optioned for film and television in cooperation with Zorro Productions, but the work did not make it to the screen.

In 1982 Collins wrote the book, music, and lyrics for a two-and-a-half-hour radio musical called Neil and the Big Banana that was twice broadcast in five episodes, in Canada on CBC Radio. Collins also played the part of Neil.

When comics scholars examine Collins's work, specifically Neil the Horse, it has been said that her comics are “Rooted in the North American independent comics scene”, bringing to life “forgotten elements of comics memory (girls’ comics, childish funny animals) that are in many ways antithetical to the “grown up” image of comics that was being cultivated contemporaneously”. In response to these assertions that Neil the Horse appears to be heavily rooted in nostalgia, Collins herself has noted that it never occurred to her that these comics were looking back at all but were rather an alternative approach to real life.

Later career 
Collins’s career abruptly ended following her transition in the early 1990s, a time where she faced ostracization from the comics community. During part of this hiatus period, Collins worked as a support worker for people with mental and physical disabilities from 2007 until 2016 when she retired for health reasons.

In recent years, Collins’s work has seen a resurgence in popularity and recognition. In 2017, her work was republished by Conundrum Press in an anthology titled The Collected Neil the Horse, featuring all fifteen issues of the Neil the Horse comic book, the weekly comic strips, and various other pieces of her work over the course of her career.

Awards 
In 1983, Collins was awarded an Inkpot Award, among the ranks of other acclaimed comics artists such as Robert Crumb (1989), Howard Cruse (1989), Neil Gaiman (1991), and Art Spiegelman (1987).

In 2013, Collins was inducted into the Joe Shuster Award Canadian Comic Book Creator Hall of Fame, and sent an acceptance video to the ceremony. In 2017, Collins was inducted into the "Giants of the North" hall of fame by the Doug Wright Awards for Canadian Cartooning.

Personal life 
Katherine Collins was born in Vancouver, British Columbia. She transitioned, identifying publicly as a transgender woman since 1993.

From 1995 until 1999, Collins spent these years with her domestic partner, Dr. Barbara Ellen Bentley (“Bobbie Bentley”), whom she planned to marry before Bentley died from cancer in 1999. During their relationship, they were very active in the San Francisco transgender community.

It has been mentioned that Collins wrote a book on her physical and spiritual journey in transitioning to a woman, though it is likely that work was never published.

In 2005, after fifteen years in San Francisco, Collins was deported under the USA PATRIOT Act for "crimes of moral turpitude." After her return to Vancouver, Collins was diagnosed with leukemia. In 2008, she announced she was recovering.

References

External links 
Hall of Fame Biography, Joe Shuster Awards
Katherine Collins at Prism Comics
"Introducing Arn Saba's Neil The Horse," CBC Digital Archives (Broadcast date: April 26, 1977)
Saba radio and TV appearances, CBC Digital Archives
 The Comics Journal #255 (Sept. 2003).

1947 births
Artists from Vancouver
Canadian graphic novelists
Canadian women cartoonists
Canadian comics artists
Canadian comics writers
Female comics writers
LGBT comics creators
Living people
Canadian LGBT artists
Musicians from Vancouver
LGBT media personalities
Canadian transgender writers
University of British Columbia alumni
Writers from Vancouver
Canadian LGBT novelists
Canadian media personalities
Canadian female comics artists
Transgender women musicians
Transgender novelists